Lycée Georges Brassens is a senior high school/sixth-form college in Villeneuve-le-Roi, Val-de-Marne, France, in the Paris metropolitan area.

History

In May 2016 a teacher stated that the school had been contaminated with mold.

The school closed temporarily on Wednesday 8 June 2016 due to a decision from prefectural authorities. Dominique Chauvin, cosecrétaire général du syndicat national des enseignements de second degré de Créteil (Snes), stated that the campus at the time was in poor condition.

In December 2017, a part of the roof in a classroom of the third floor fell, and the teachers decided to apply their "right of withdrawal" for asbestos suspicion. The teachers protested several times, asking the Academy and the District for air tests and new buildings. This led the high school students to miss almost two months of class. After many weeks, the Lycée Brassens administration decided to relocate the students in a substitution building in Vitry-Sur-Seine, another city of the district.

References

External links
 Lycée Georges Brassens 
 http://www.leparisien.fr/val-de-marne-94/villeneuve-le-roi-les-lyceens-de-brassens-transferes-a-vitry-20-01-2018-7512267.php
 Articles about the school at 94.citoyens.com
 https://france3-regions.francetvinfo.fr/paris-ile-de-france/val-de-marne/val-marne-droit-retrait-enseignants-du-lycee-brassens-villeneuve-roi-1554298.html

Lycées in Val-de-Marne